This is a list of protected areas of American Samoa.

Local marine protected areas
Alofau Village Marine Protected Area
Amaua and Auto Village Marine Protected Area
Fagamalo Village Marine Protected Area
Masausi Village Marine Protected Area
Matuu and Faganeanea Village Marine Protected Area
Poloa Village Marine Protected Area
Vatia Village Marine Protected Area

References

 
American Samoa
American Samoa-related lists